The Greater Antillean oriole was split into 4 species in 2010:

Bahama oriole
Cuban oriole
Hispaniolan oriole
Puerto Rican oriole

Birds by common name
Orioles